Aloconota is a genus of beetles belonging to the family Staphylinidae.

The genus was described in 1858 by Carl Gustaf Thomson.

The genus has cosmopolitan distribution.

Species:
 Aloconota currax
 Aloconota debilicornis
 Aloconota gregaria
 Aloconota insecta
 Aloconota planifrons
 Aloconota sulcifrons

References

Staphylinidae